The Permanent Representative of the President of Ukraine in the Autonomous Republic of Crimea represents the President of Ukraine in the Autonomous Republic of Crimea.

Originally created in 1992 as the Presidential representative of Ukraine in Crimea, the first representative was not appointed until March 1994. The first representative was Valeriy Horbatov, who worked as a head of the Krupskaya collective farm in Nyzhnohirskyi Raion, Crimean Oblast.

Presidential representatives
 1994–1996: Valeriy Horbatov
 1996-1997: Dmytro Stepanyuk
 1997–1999: Vasiliy Kiselyov
 1999–2002: Anatoliy Korniychuk
 2002-2004: Alexander Didenko
 2005–2006: Volodymyr Kulish
 2006–2007: Hennadiy Moskal
 2007-2007: Viktor Shemchuk
 2007-2007: Volodymyr Khomenko
 2008-2010: Leonid Zhunko
 2010-2010: Serhiy Kunitsyn
 2010-2011: Viktor Plakida (acting)
 2011–2011: Volodymyr Yatsuba
 2012–2014: Viktor Plakida (acting in 2011–12)
 2014-2014: Serhiy Kunitsyn (acting)
 2014-2017: Natalia Popovych<ref>Turchynov appointed a new presidential representative in Crimea. Segodnya. 23 May 2014</refNataliya Popovych. Slovo I Dilo.</ref>
 2017-2018: Borys Babin<ref>Presidential ukase #405/2018. About firing of B.Babin from the post of permanent presidential representative of Ukraine in Crimea (Про звільнення Б.Бабіна з посади Постійного Представника Президента України в Автономній Республіці Крим). President of Ukraine website. 3 December 2018</ref>
 2018-2019: Izet Hdanov'' (acting, as first deputy)
 2019–2022: Anton Korynevych
 2022-present: Tamila Tasheva

See also
 Representatives of the President of Ukraine
 Prime Minister of Crimea

Notes

References

External links
Law of Ukraine about the Representation of the President of Ukraine in the Autonomous Republic of Crimea

 
Crimea
Kherson Oblast